Tuzla Jegin Lug Airport  is a public use airport located near Tuzla, Bosnia and Herzegovina. Tuzla Jegin Lug Airport is situated in Donji Rainci, about 7 miles far away from Tuzla Town in SE direction (heading 110 degrees). The function of the airport is currently sport flying, recreation and tourism, with BHDCA registered flight training school. Owner and operator of Tuzla Jegin Lug Airport (LQJL) is Aero club Tuzla (BHDCA Certificate no. Е-7-L-004).

In 2017, the airfield underwent major renovation and modernization and is now able to host more recreational events.

See also
List of airports in Bosnia and Herzegovina

References

External links 
 Airport record for Tuzla Jegin Lug Airport at Landings.com
 Bosnia and Herzegovina Directorate of Civil Aviation at bhdca.gov.ba
 more info from operator of Tuzla Jegin Lug Airport  at aeroklubtuzla.ba

Airports in Bosnia and Herzegovina